Higginbottom is a surname of English origin. It is a corruption of Oakenbottom, a place in Bolton-le-Moors, probably influenced by the dialect word hickin or higgin, the mountain ash.

The name may refer to:
 Edward Higginbottom (born 1946), British choral director
 Frederick Higginbottom (1859–1943), British journalist and newspaper editor
 Heather Higginbottom (born c. 1972), American politician
 Jake Higginbottom (born 1993), Australian professional golfer
 Sam Higginbottom (1874–1958), English-born American missionary to India, founder of the Allahabad Agricultural Institute

References